Marcus Modigs (born April 6, 1992) is a Swedish professional ice hockey player who currently plays for Linköpings HC of the Swedish Elitserien.

References

External links

1992 births
Living people
Linköping HC players
Swedish ice hockey left wingers